Gillian Norris (born 29 December 1978) is an Irish dancer and model best known for her work in Lord of the Dance and Feet of Flames.

Norris was born in Kilmacthomas, County Waterford, Ireland on 29 December 1978 to Mary Norris and Desmond Norris, a carpenter and well-known tenor.  Norris is the youngest of five children.  She started dancing at the age 10, when her parents signed her up for dance lessons at the Higgins School of Irish Dance in Waterford.  She later won the All-Ireland, Great Britain, and British National titles and placed 3rd at the World Championships.
  
Norris debuted as a professional dancer when she played "Morrighan, The Temptress" in Michael Flatley's show, Lord of the Dance. Gillian danced with the show from its premiere in July 1996 at the Point Theater in Dublin until her departure in 2000. Gillian toured the world with the show. Her rendition of Morrighan has been featured in two videos: The original video and the 1998 Feet of Flames video (taped live in Hyde Park, London).

When the show began in 1996, she danced with Michael Flatley in the original show for a year, and then in late 1997 joined the second touring company (Troupe 2) in the United States. In July 1998, she returned to Troupe 1 and danced the lead in Feet of Flames in Hyde Park. She remained with Troupe 1 and toured Europe until she left the show in 2000.

After Gillian left the show, she returned to Ireland and briefly pursued a modeling and singing career. In summer 2001, she briefly danced in the show Ragus in Dublin. She then enrolled in beauty therapy school, where she was a top student. In June 2005, she opened her own beauty salon/spa in Kilmacthomas.

Gillian says about performing, "To me, no matter if there's two people I'm performing to or 20,000 people, I'd perform the same way. I go out to make those happy; they deserve that, they're paying to see me dance and that's what I do; I go out and do my job."

External links
Gillian Norris Biography 
Gillian Norris Connection Fan site
Gillian Norris Forever
Gillian Norris website (by Jen Smith)
Ragus Review
The Ragus Experience (by James Stevens) James met Norris and wrote of his experience seeing her dance in Ragus in 2001. Includes some RealPlayer videos of Norris dancing.
Interview with Irish Dancing Magazine
Interview with the Celtic Cafe 2001
Gillian's dancing Clips on Youtube

1978 births
20th-century Irish people
21st-century Irish people
Living people
People from County Waterford
Irish female dancers
Performers of Irish dance